The 35th Infantry Division (German: 35. Infanteriedivision) was a German Army infantry division in World War II.

History 
The 35th Infantry Division was raised in October 1936 in Germany's re-militarisation. It was mostly used on the eastern front.

In May 1940, the division was part of the German forces sent to invade France and Belgium, remaining as an occupational formation in the two nations until June the next year, when it took part in Operation Barbarossa (the invasion of the Soviet Union). Between then and April 1945 the division would remain in the central and southern sectors before being forced back to East Prussia by the advancing Red Army.

The 35th Infantry Division was one of many Wehrmacht units which committed war crimes in the Soviet Union. During early 1944 it was involved in an operation in the Gomel Region of Belarus in which 40,000 civilians were expelled from their homes as the German Army retreated; approximately 9,000 civilians died. The 35th Infantry Division undertook a similar operation in early April 1944 in which it rounded up civilians who it then either used for forced labour or expelled from the region; 3,500 were expelled. During that month, the divisional engineer battalion's third company massacred civilians in the towns of Karpilovka and Rudabelka. This operation was planned by the company's officers, who retained control over their soldiers during the killings. Nine members of the division were convicted of this massacre by a Soviet military tribunal in 1947 and sentenced to 25 years hard labour.

Commanders 
Generalleutnant Hubert Schaller-Kallide (12 Oct 1936 - 24 November 1938)
General der Infanterie Hans Wolfgang Reinhard (24 November 1938 - 25 November 1940)
General der Infanterie Walther Fischer von Weikersthal (25 November 1940 - 1 December 1941)
General der Artillerie Rudolf Freiherr von Roman (1 December 1941 - 10 September 1942)
Generalleutnant Ludwig Merker (10 September 1942 - April 1943)
Generalleutnant Otto Drescher (Apr 1943 - 8 June 1943)
Generalleutnant Ludwig Merker (8 June 1943 - 5 November 1943)
Generalleutnant Johann-Georg Richert (5 November 1943 - 9 April 1944)
Generalmajor Gustav Gihr (9 April 1944 - 11 May 1944)
Generalleutnant Johann-Georg Richert (11 May 1944 - May 1945)
Generalmajor der Reserve Dr. Ernst Meiners (May 1945)

Order of battle

1939
34.Infanterie-Regiment
109. Infanterie-Regiment
111. Infanterie-Regiment
35. Aufklärungs-Abteilung
35. Artillerie-Regiment
35. Beobachtungs-Abteilung
35. Pionier-Bataillon
35. Panzerabwehr-Abteilung
35. Nachrichten-Abteilung
35. Feldersatz-Bataillon
35. Versorgungseinheiten

1942
34. Füsilier-Regiment
109. Grenadier-Regiment
111. Grenadier-Regiment
35. Radfahr-Abteilung
35. Artillerie-Regiment
35. Pionier-Bataillon
35. Panzerjäger-Abteilung
35. Nachrichten-Abteilung
35. Feldersatz-Bataillon
35. Versorgungseinheiten

1943
34. Füsilier-Regiment
109. Grenadier-Regiment
111. Grenadier-Regiment
35. Füsilier-Bataillon
35. Artillerie-Regiment
35. Pionier-Bataillon
35. Panzerjäger-Abteilung
35. Nachrichten-Abteilung
35. Feldersatz-Bataillon
35. Versorgungseinheiten

See also 
 Division (military), Military unit, List of German divisions in World War II
 Army, Wehrmacht

References
Citations

Works consulted

Military units and formations established in 1936
Military units and formations disestablished in 1945
0*035
War crimes of the Wehrmacht